The 2007–08 season was Newcastle Jets' third season in the Hyundai A-League and their most successful, placing second in the regular season, and defeating Central Coast Mariners in the Grand Final to be crowned the 2007–08 Champions.

Players

First team squad

Players

Transfers

In

Out

Matches

2007 Pre-season Cup

2007-08 Hyundai A-League fixtures

2007-08 Finals series

League table

Statistics

Goal scorers

References

Newcastle Jets FC seasons
Newcastle Jets Season, 2007-08